Gunung Mas Regency is one of the thirteen regencies of Central Kalimantan Province, Indonesia. The regency seat is located at the town of Kuala Kurun in Kurun District. The population of Gunung Mas Regency was 96,900 at the 2010 Census (an increase from 74,823 at the previous Census in 2000); and 135,373 at the 2020 Census; the offiocial estimate as at mid 2021 was 138,407.

The regency initially existed between 1965 to 1979, after which it was a district within Kapuas Regency. Its status as a regency was restored following rapid decentralization and democratization following fall of Suharto. The regency has the 5th highest Human Development Index in the province.

History

Etymology 
The regency's name literally translates to "gold mountain". The name originates the abundance of gold during the Dutch East Indies era, especially around the village of Sumur Mas, which name literally translates to "well of gold", while a nearby mountain is named "Gunung Mas". Remains of the colonial era gold industry, such as abandoned factory chimneys and holes used to mine gold, can still be seen in the region today such .

Due to its colonial origin, there have been calls to change the name of the regency, such as by the local government, which argues that the name does not reflect the regency's motto, Habangkalan Penyang Karuhei Tatau, which is derived from the local Ngaju language and local wisdom.

Creation 
The regency was initially created on 1 October 1964 as Kahayan Hulu Administrative Regency, and was renamed Gunung Mas Administrative Regency on 1 May 1965. On 28 April 1979,the regency became a subdivision of the larger Kapuas Regency, while the title of its administrative head changed from a regent (bupati) to chief office of assistant for Gunung Mas region.

In 1999, after Reformasi, the region became Kurun District (kecamatan). Subsequently, demands were made by local figures, traditional Dayak chiefs, and residents of the region in the "Declaration by Gunung Mas Society" (Indonesian:Deklasari Masyarakat Gunung Mas). The declaration resulted in three points, which:

 To acknowledge Wednesday the 21st of March 2001 as the birth date of Gunung Mas Regency with the regency seat in Kuala Kurun.
 To demand central government of Indonesia to proceed with the creation of the Gunung Mas Regency in accordance of the law.
 Other matters to fulfill the requirements for the establishment of a regency as written in the Government Regulation No. 129 of 2000 will be processed in the shortest possible time.

The declaration was read on 21 March 2001, and as a result, the regency was formed on 10 April 2002 based on Law Number 5 of 2002.

Governance

Local government 
The Gunung Mas Regency is a second-level administrative division equivalent to a city, and is headed by a democratically elected regent. District heads are appointed directly by the regent on the recommendation of the regency secretary. Executive power lies with the regent and vice regent while legislative function is exercised by the regency's parliament.

Politics 
Together with Palangka Raya and Katingan Regency, the regency forms part of the 1st Central Kalimantan electoral district, electing 10 out of 45 representatives in the provincial parliament. At the local level, the regency is divided into three electoral districts which have a total of 25 representatives.

Administrative divisions 
The regency is divided into 12 districts.  Kurun, where the town of Kuala Kurun is located, is the regency's most populous district with 25.15 % of regency's total population in 2021. The fastest growing district in 2021 was Mihing Raya with growth of 4.67 % while the least was Miri Manasa with 1.27 %. The most dense district is also Kurun, with density of 39.7 people per square kilometre in mid 2021, while the least dense was Miri Manasa with just 2.7 people per square kilometre. The gender ratio varies from district to district, from 116 males for every 100 females in Kahayan Hulu Utara to 107 males for every 100 females in Sepang. The statistics for all the districts are listed below.

Economy 
In 2021, the regency had a total gross regional domestic product (GRDP) of 3,619 billion rupiahs. While the region's economy was historically centered around mining, especially that of gold, the largest economic sector in the regency as of 2021 is agriculture and fisheries, making up 29.24% of the regency's GRDP, followed by construction with 11.89 %, trade with 10.08 %, and manufacturing with 8.25 %. The regency's agricultural output includes 100,347 tons of palm oil, 1,152 tons of rice, 5,004 quintals of durian, 414 quintals of mango, and 730 quintals of banana. As of 2021, the fastest growing sector in the economy was internet and communication, with 18.43 % growth, followed by electricity and gas with 15.59 %, and healthcare with 9.71 %.

In 2021, the regency had 15 operating banks, and 218 registered cooperatives, an increase of 2.83% from the previous year. In addition, the regency had a 2.49 % unemployment rate and a 4.75 % poverty rate in the same year.

Infrastructure

Education 
There are 382 kindergartens, 181 elementary schools, 60 junior high schools, 15 senior high schools and four vocational high schools in the regency as of 2021, as well as a special education school in Kurun. The regency has no higher education institutions, and the regency government frequently awards scholarships to students in the region to pursue higher education outside of the regency. The regency has a literacy rate of 99.21%, slightly higher than in neighbouring regions.

Healthcare 
There are two hospitals, one polyclinic, 86 puskesmas, and seven pharmacies in the regency. The main hospital of the regency, Kuala Kurun Regional Hospital, is located in the town of Kuala Kurun and classified as C-class hospital by Ministry of Health. The other hospital, Pratama Tumbang Talaken Hospital, is a private hospital located in Manuhing district and classified as D-class. The regency had a life expectancy of 70.40 years in 2021, close to the national average.

Transportation 
The regency is served by Sangkalemu Airport in Kuala Kurun, which has weekly scheduled flights to Banjarmasin. The road to Palangka Raya is often in poor condition due to its use by overweight vehicles, and frequently experiences traffic congestion.

Others 
The regency has 45 mosques, 252 churches, and 77 Balinese temple. Urban parks are found across the regency, most notably in Kuala Kurun. In Kuala Kurun, the town park has shelter built for street vendors as part of relocation program by the government to reduce their presence in main roads.  There are 22 hotels registered in the regency, which more than half is located on Kurun District.

References

Notes 

Regencies of Central Kalimantan
2002 establishments in Indonesia